Pedro de Oviedo Falconi (died 13 October 1649) was a Roman Catholic prelate who served as the Archbishop of La Plata o Charcas (1645–1649), Archbishop of Quito (1628–1645), and Archbishop of Santo Domingo (1621–1628).

Biography
Pedro de Oviedo Falconi was born in Alcalá de Henares, Spain and ordained a priest in the Cistercian Order. On 11 January 1621 he was appointed by the King of Spain and confirmed by Pope Urban VIII as Archbishop of Santo Domingo. He was consecrated bishop by Gonzalo de Angulo, Bishop of Coro. On 14 May 1628 he was appointed by the King of Spain and confirmed by Pope Urban VIII, on 10 July 1628, as Archbishop (personal title) of the Diocese of Quito. On 14 June 1645 he was appointed by the King of Spain and confirmed by Pope Innocent X on 21 August 1645 as Archbishop of La Plata o Charcas. He served as Archbishop of La Plata o Charcas until his death on 13 October 1649.

While bishop, he was the principal Consecrator of Bernardo de Valbuena y Villanueva, Bishop of Puerto Rico and Diego Montoya Mendoza, Bishop of Popayán.

References

External links and additional sources
 (for Chronology of Bishops) 
 (for Chronology of Bishops) 
 (for Chronology of Bishops) 
 (for Chronology of Bishops) 
 (for Chronology of Bishops) 
 (for Chronology of Bishops) 

1649 deaths
People from Alcalá de Henares
Bishops appointed by Pope Urban VIII
Bishops appointed by Pope Innocent X
Cistercian bishops
Roman Catholic archbishops of Santo Domingo
17th-century Roman Catholic bishops in Ecuador
17th-century Roman Catholic archbishops in the Dominican Republic
Roman Catholic bishops of Quito
Roman Catholic archbishops of Sucre